Jacob Basil Anderson (born 18 June 1990) is a British actor and musician. As an actor, he is known for his roles as Grey Worm in Game of Thrones and Louis de Pointe du Lac in Anne Rice’s Interview with the Vampire, and his recurring appearances in the first seasons of Episodes and Broadchurch, and the thirteenth series of the revival of Doctor Who. As a musician, he uses the alias Raleigh Ritchie (named after his favourite characters from The Royal Tenenbaums); his debut album, You're a Man Now, Boy, was a soul and trip hop album released in 2016 to positive reviews. Anderson's second studio album, Andy, was released in 2020.

Early life
Anderson was born and raised in Bristol, England. His father is of Afro-Caribbean descent. At the age of 17, Anderson moved to London in order to launch his music career.

Acting career
Anderson played Angelo in the film 4.3.2.1. He starred in the ITV drama series Injustice as Simon, a teenager in a youth offender institution. He also had a one-episode guest role on Outnumbered. He also appeared in an episode of Skins, and appeared in the feature film Comedown, co-starring Adulthoods Adam Deacon and directed by Kidulthood director Menhaj Huda. Anderson featured in various plays, including Dunsinane for the RSC, King Lear (with Pete Postlethwaite) at the Young Vic Theatre, and War Horse at the National Theatre. He was seen in the teen slasher film Demons Never Die, playing Ricky, and appeared in the BBC Two comedy Episodes, alongside Matt LeBlanc and Stephen Mangan.

In 2012, Anderson was cast for the third season of HBO's television series Game of Thrones as Grey Worm, the leader of Daenerys Targaryen's Unsullied army. Anderson continued to portray this role through season 4, season 5, season 6, season 7 and season 8. He played Dean Thomas, the boyfriend of Chloe Latimer, on the ITV drama Broadchurch in 2013.  In July 2021, he was revealed to be joining the cast of Doctor Who for the 13th series. In August 2021, Anderson was cast as Louis de Pointe du Lac in the AMC television series Interview with the Vampire.

Music career

2005–2009: Early career
In 2006, Anderson was featured as a vocalist on Typesun's "The PL". They released another track in 2007, titled "Let Me Know." Anderson recorded a song with Plan B, which was featured on the Adulthood soundtrack, titled "Plan B".

2010–2017: You're a Man Now, Boy
In 2013, Anderson signed to Columbia Records, and released a free three-track EP, The Middle Child, under the stage name Raleigh Ritchie. A second EP, Black and Blue, followed in 2014.

Anderson's musical influences include Erykah Badu, David Bowie, Jill Scott, The Smiths, and Stevie Wonder. In March 2014, his track "Stronger Than Ever" from Black and Blue was remixed by UK garage producer MJ Cole and released as a standalone single. "Stronger Than Ever" has been used in television adverts promoting the launch of ITV Encore, as well as in montage videos during Sky Sports' coverage of Professional Darts Corporation events. The song reached number 30 on the UK Singles Chart in June 2014. Anderson supported George Ezra on his February 2015 UK tour.

His debut album, You're a Man Now, Boy, was released on 26 February 2016; it charted at number 32 on the UK Albums Chart. He also featured on Stormzy's debut album Gang Signs & Prayer track 13 – "Don't Cry For Me" which was released on 24 February 2017.

2020–present: Andy 
On 6 May 2020, Anderson released a new single called "Aristocrats". It was the second single to promote Anderson's second studio album Andy, after a 2018 single "Time In A Tree" also included on the record. In June, "Aristocrats" was followed by the songs "Party Fear" and "Squares". Andy was released on 26 June 2020 via Alacran Records.

On 30 July 2021, Anderson released the single "Say What You Mean". Robin Murray for Clash called it a "defiant return". Anderson commented, “I write songs for myself, to get things off my chest and process my emotions, but then I release them and I don’t own them anymore […] I hope there is someone who listens to it and […] I hope that makes them feel less lonely.”  "Say What You Mean" was followed by the release of the single "Lucky".

Personal life 
Anderson has two younger siblings, sisters Charlotte and Olivia. 
In December 2018, Anderson married actress Aisling Loftus. He and Loftus are parents of a daughter, born July 2020.

Discography

You're a Man Now, Boy (2016)
Andy (2020)

Filmography

Film

Television

Web

Awards and nominations

Notes

References

External links
 

1990 births
21st-century British male actors
21st-century Black British male singers
Black British male actors
British contemporary R&B singers
British male film actors
British male television actors
English people of West Indian descent
Columbia Records artists
Living people
Male actors from Bristol
Musicians from Bristol